Wrens are a family of brown passerine birds in the predominantly New World family Troglodytidae. The family includes 88 species divided into 19 genera. Only the Eurasian wren occurs in the Old World, where, in Anglophone regions, it is commonly known simply as the "wren", as it is the originator of the name. The name wren has been applied to other, unrelated birds, particularly the New Zealand wrens (Acanthisittidae) and the Australian wrens (Maluridae).

Most wrens are visually inconspicuous though they have loud and often complex songs. Exceptions include the relatively large members of the genus Campylorhynchus, which can be quite bold in their behaviour. Wrens have short wings that are barred in most species, and they often hold their tails upright. Wrens are primarily insectivorous, eating insects, spiders and other small invertebrates, but many species also eat vegetable matter and some eat small frogs and lizards.

Etymology and usage
This points to a Common Germanic name , but the further etymology of the name is unknown.

The bird that could fly to the highest altitude would be made king. The eagle outflew all other birds, but he was beaten by a small bird that had hidden in his plumage. This fable was already known to Aristotle (Historia Animalium 9.11) and Pliny (Natural History 10.95), and was taken up by medieval authors such as Johann Geiler von Kaisersberg, but it most likely originally concerned kinglets (such as the goldcrest) and was apparently motivated by the yellow "crown" sported by these birds (a point noted already by Ludwig Uhland). The confusion stemmed in part from the similarity and consequent interchangeability of the Ancient Greek words for the wren ('king') and the crest ('kinglet'), and the legend's reference to the "smallest of birds" becoming king likely led the title to be transferred to the equally tiny wren.

The family name Troglodytidae is derived from troglodyte, which means 'cave-dweller'. Wrens get their scientific name from the tendency of some species to forage in dark crevices.

The name "wren" is also ascribed to other families of passerine birds throughout the world. In Europe, kinglets are commonly known as "wrens", with the common firecrest and goldcrest known as  the "fire-crested wren" and "golden-crested wren", respectively.

The 27 Australasian "wren" species in the family Maluridae are unrelated, as are the New Zealand wrens in the family Acanthisittidae, the antbirds in the family Thamnophilidae, and the Old World babblers of the family Timaliidae.

Description
Wrens are medium-small to very small birds. The Eurasian wren is among the smallest birds in its range, while the smaller species from the Americas are among the smallest passerines in that part of the world. The dominating colors of their plumage are generally drab, composed of gray, brown, black, and white, and most species show some barring, especially on the tail or wings. No sexual dimorphism is seen in the plumage of wrens, and little difference exists between young birds and adults. All have fairly long, straight to marginally decurved (downward-curving) bills.

Wrens have loud and often complex songs, sometimes given in duet by a pair. The songs of members of the genera Cyphorhinus and Microcerculus have been considered especially pleasant to the human ear, leading to common names such as song wren, musician wren, flutist wren, and southern nightingale-wren.

Distribution and habitat
 
Wrens are principally a New World family, distributed from Alaska and Canada to southern Argentina, with the greatest species richness in the Neotropics. As suggested by its name, the Eurasian wren is the only species of wren found outside the Americas, as restricted to Europe, Asia, and northern Africa (it was formerly considered conspecific with the winter wren and Pacific wren of North America). The insular species include the Clarión wren and Socorro wren from the Revillagigedo Islands in the Pacific Ocean, and Cobb's wren in the Falkland Islands, but few Caribbean islands have a species of wren, with only the southern house wren in the Lesser Antilles, the Cozumel wren of Cozumel Island, and the highly restricted Zapata wren in a single swamp in Cuba.

The various species occur in a wide range of habitats, ranging from dry, sparsely wooded country to rainforests. Most species are mainly found at low levels, but members of the genus Campylorhynchus are frequently found higher, and the two members of Odontorchilus are restricted to the forest canopy. A few species, notably the Eurasian wren and the house wren, are often associated with humans. Most species are resident, remaining in Central and South America all year round, but the few species found in temperate regions of the Northern Hemisphere are partially migratory, spending the winter further south.

Behavior and ecology

Wrens vary from highly secretive species such as those found in the genus Microcerculus to the highly conspicuous genus Campylorhynchus, the members of which frequently sing from exposed perches. The family as a whole exhibits a great deal of variation in their behavior. Temperate species generally occur in pairs, but some tropical species may occur in parties of up to 20 birds.

Wrens build dome-shaped nests, and may be either monogamous or polygamous, depending on species.

Though little is known about the feeding habits of many of the Neotropical species, wrens are considered primarily insectivorous, eating insects, spiders, and other small arthropods. Many species also take vegetable matter such as seeds and berries, and some (primarily the larger species) take small frogs and lizards. The Eurasian wren has been recorded wading into shallow water to catch small fish and tadpoles; Sumichrast's wren and the Zapata wren take snails; and the giant wren and marsh wren have been recorded attacking and eating bird eggs (in the latter species, even eggs of conspecifics). The plain wren and northern house wren sometimes destroy bird eggs, and the rufous-and-white wren has been recorded killing nestlings, but this is apparently to eliminate potential food competitors rather than to feed on the eggs or nestlings. Several species of Neotropical wrens sometimes participate in mixed-species flocks or follow army ants, and the Eurasian wren may follow badgers to catch prey items disturbed by them.

Taxonomy and systematics

Revised following Martínez Gómez et al. (2005) and Mann et al. (2006), the taxonomy of some groups is highly complex, and future species-level splits are likely. Additionally, undescribed taxa are known to exist. The black-capped donacobius is an enigmatic species traditionally placed with the wrens more for lack of a more apparent alternative than as a result of thorough study. It was recently determined to be most likely closer to certain warblers, possibly the newly established Megaluridae, and might constitute a monotypic family.

Family Troglodytidae

Genus Campylorhynchus
 White-headed wren (Campylorhynchus albobrunneus)
 Band-backed wren (Campylorhynchus zonatus)
 Grey-barred wren (Campylorhynchus megalopterus)
 Stripe-backed wren (Campylorhynchus nuchalis)
 Fasciated wren (Campylorhynchus fasciatus)
 Giant wren (Campylorhynchus chiapensis)
 Bicolored wren (Campylorhynchus griseus)
 Veracruz wren (Campylorhynchus rufinucha)
 Sclater's wren (Campylorhynchus humilis)
 Rufous-backed wren (Campylorhynchus capistratus)
 Spotted wren (Campylorhynchus gularis)
 Yucatan wren (Campylorhynchus yucatanicus)
 Boucard's wren (Campylorhynchus jocosus)
 Cactus wren (Campylorhynchus brunneicapillus)
 Thrush-like wren (Campylorhynchus turdinus)
 
Genus Odontorchilus
 Grey-mantled wren (Odontorchilus branickii)
 Tooth-billed wren (Odontorchilus cinereus)

Genus Salpinctes
 Rock wren (Salpinctes obsoletus)
 
Genus Catherpes
 Canyon wren (Catherpes mexicanus)
Genus Hylorchilus
 Sumichrast's wren (Hylorchilus sumichrasti)
 Nava's wren (Hylorchilus navai)
Genus Cinnycerthia
 Rufous wren (Cinnycerthia unirufa)
 Sepia-brown wren (Cinnycerthia olivascens)
 Peruvian wren (Cinnycerthia peruana)
 Fulvous wren (Cinnycerthia fulva)
Genus Cistothorus
 Sedge wren (Cistothorus stellaris)
 Mérida wren or paramo wren (Cistothorus meridae)
 Apolinar's wren (Cistothorus apolinari)
 Grass wren (Cistothorus platensis)
 Marsh wren (Cistothorus palustris)

Genus Thryomanes
 Bewick's wren (Thryomanes bewickii)
Genus Ferminia
 Zapata wren (Ferminia cerverai)

Genus Pheugopedius (formerly included in Thryothorus)
 Black-throated wren (Pheugopedius atrogularis)
 Sooty-headed wren (Pheugopedius spadix)
 Black-bellied wren (Pheugopedius fasciatoventris)
 Plain-tailed wren (Pheugopedius euophrys)
 Inca wren (Pheugopedius eisenmanni)
 Moustached wren (Pheugopedius genibarbis)
 Whiskered wren (Pheugopedius mystacalis)
 Coraya wren (Pheugopedius coraya)
 Happy wren (Pheugopedius felix)
 Spot-breasted wren (Pheugopedius maculipectus)
 Rufous-breasted wren (Pheugopedius rutilus)
 Speckle-breasted wren (Pheugopedius sclateri)
Genus Thryophilus (formerly included in Thryothorus)
 Banded wren (Thryophilus pleurostictus)
 Rufous-and-white wren (Thryophilus rufalbus)
Antioquia wren (Thryophilus sernai)
 Niceforo's wren (Thryophilus nicefori)
 Sinaloa wren (Thryophilus sinaloa)

Genus Cantorchilus (formerly included in Thryothorus)
 Cabanis's wren (Cantorchilus modestus)
 Canebrake wren (Cantorchilus zeledoni)
 Isthmian wren (Cantorchilus elutus)
 Buff-breasted wren (Cantorchilus leucotis) (probably not monophyletic)
 Superciliated wren (Cantorchilus superciliaris)
 Fawn-breasted wren (Cantorchilus guarayanus)
 Long-billed wren (Cantorchilus longirostris)
 Grey wren (Cantorchilus griseus)
 Riverside wren (Cantorchilus semibadius)
 Bay wren (Cantorchilus nigricapillus)
Stripe-breasted wren (Cantorchilus thoracicus)
 Stripe-throated wren (Cantorchilus leucopogon)
Genus Thryothorus
Carolina wren (Thryothorus ludovicianus)
 White-browed wren (Thryothorus (ludovicianus) albinucha)

 
Genus Troglodytes (10–15 species, depending on taxonomy; includes species sometimes considered to be in the genus Nannus, which may be distinct)
Eurasian wren (Troglodytes troglodytes)
 Winter wren (Troglodytes hiemalis)
 Pacific wren (Troglodytes pacificus)
 Clarión wren (Troglodytes tanneri)
House wren (Troglodytes aedon)
 Cobb's wren (Troglodytes cobbi)
 Socorro wren (Troglodytes sissonii)
 Rufous-browed wren (Troglodytes rufociliatus)
 Ochraceous wren (Troglodytes ochraceus)
 Mountain wren (Troglodytes solstitialis)
 Santa Marta wren (Troglodytes monticola)
 Tepui wren (Troglodytes rufulus)
Genus Thryorchilus
 Timberline wren (Thryorchilus browni)
Genus Uropsila
 White-bellied wren (Uropsila leucogastra)
Genus Henicorhina (wood wrens)
 White-breasted wood wren (Henicorhina leucosticta)
 Grey-breasted wood wren (Henicorhina leucophrys)
 Hermit wood wren (Henicorhina anachoreta) – split from H. leucophrys
Bar-winged wood wren (Henicorhina leucoptera)
 Munchique wood wren (Henicorhina negreti)
Genus Microcerculus
 Northern nightingale-wren (Microcerculus philomela)
 Southern nightingale-wren (Microcerculus marginatus)
 Flutist wren (Microcerculus ustulatus)
 Wing-banded wren (Microcerculus bambla)
Genus Cyphorhinus
 Chestnut-breasted wren (Cyphorhinus thoracicus)
 Musician wren (Cyphorhinus arada)
 Song wren (Cyphorhinus phaeocephalus)

Relationship with humans
The wren features prominently in culture. The Eurasian wren has been long considered "the king of birds" in Europe. Killing one or harassing its nest is associated with bad luck, such as broken bones, lightning strikes on homes, or injury to cattle. Wren Day, celebrated in parts of Ireland on St. Stephen's Day (26 December), features a fake wren being paraded around town on a decorative pole; up to the 20th century, real birds were hunted for this purpose. A possible origin for the tradition is revenge for the betrayal of Saint Stephen by a noisy wren when he was trying to hide from enemies in a bush.

The Eurasian Wren is one of the symbols of the Celtic Zodiac.

The Carolina wren (Thryothorus ludovicianus) has been the state bird of South Carolina since 1948, and features on the back of its state quarter. The British farthing featured a wren on the reverse side from 1937 until its demonetisation in 1960. The Cactus wren (Campylorhynchus brunneicapillus) was designated the state bird of Arizona in 1931.

References

 
  [English with Spanish abstract]

External links

 Videos, photos and sounds—Internet Bird Collection